Adeoye Ajibola is a paralympic athlete from Nigeria competing mainly in category TS4 sprint events.

Adeoye attended Saka Tinubu Secondary School, Agege in the 80's. representing the school at inter house sports events. He is his mothers first child. His siblings are Bisi, Segun, Dupe, Samson, Buki and Sola He was married with children. He competed in the 100m, 200m and long jump at both the 1992 and 1996 Summer Paralympics. At the 1992 games he didn't start the long jump competition but did break the world record in both the 100m and 200m to win gold in both events. At the 1996 Summer Paralympics he defended both sprint titles and won a silver medal in the long jump.

References

External links
 

Paralympic athletes of Nigeria
Athletes (track and field) at the 1992 Summer Paralympics
Athletes (track and field) at the 1996 Summer Paralympics
Paralympic gold medalists for Nigeria
Paralympic silver medalists for Nigeria
Nigerian male sprinters
Nigerian male long jumpers
Living people
Year of birth missing (living people)
Place of birth missing (living people)
Yoruba sportspeople
Medalists at the 1992 Summer Paralympics
Medalists at the 1996 Summer Paralympics
Paralympic medalists in athletics (track and field)
Sprinters with limb difference
Long jumpers with limb difference
Paralympic sprinters
Paralympic long jumpers
20th-century Nigerian people